The Women's snowboard big air competition at the FIS Freestyle Ski and Snowboarding World Championships 2023 was held on 2 and 4 March 2023.

Qualification
The qualification was started on 2 March at 14:30. Due to foggy weather, the run 3 had to be stopped and cancelled.
The eight best snowboarders qualified for the final.

Final
The final was started on 4 March at 12:30.

References

Women's snowboard big air